This is a list of Representatives elected to the House of Representatives for the Forty-Third session of the House of Representatives of the National Diet of Japan at the 2003 general election, held on November 9, 2003.

Composition

The Government

Liberal Democratic Party (247 members)
Shinzo Abe
Ichiro Aisawa
Norihiko Akagi
Akira Amari
Takashi Aoyama
Taro Aso
Koki Chuma
Toshiaki Endo
Takehiko Endo
Tetsuma Esaki
Yoichiro Esaki
Akinori Eto
Taku Eto
Seiichi Eto
Seishiro Eto
Takao Fujii
Yasuo Fukuda
Teru Fukui
Hajime Funada
Yoshihisa Furukawa
Keiji Furuya
Koji Futada
Shigeyuki Goto
Masazumi Gotoda
Koki Hagino
Koichi Hagiuda
Kyogon Hagiyama
Yasukazu Hamada
Yasuhiro Hanashi
Yoshitsugu Harada
Yoshiaki Harada
Hiroshi Hase
Ryutaro Hashimoto
Susumu Hasumi
Kunio Hatoyama
Chuko Hayakawa
Motoo Hayashi
Takeshi Hayashida
Takuya Hirai
Takeo Hiranuma
Katsuei Hirasawa
Koichi Hirata
Kosuke Hori
Mitsuo Horiuchi
Takeshi Hosaka
Hiroyuki Hosoda
Bunmei Ibuki
Hiroshi Imai
Masahiro Imamura
Hiroshi Imazu
Yamato Inaba
Kiichi Inoue
Shinji Inoue
Shigeru Ishiba
Masatoshi Ishida
Nobuteru Ishihara
Gaku Ishizaki
Kosuke Ito
Shintaro Ito
Tatsuya Ito
Mineichi Iwanaga
Tadao Iwasaki
Takeshi Iwaya
Shozaburo Jimi
Yukio Jitsukawa
Toshiki Kaifu
Hiroshi Kajiyama
Chiken Kakazu
Hisaoki Kamei
Yoshiyuki Kamei
Shizuka Kamei
Yoko Kamikawa
Ichiro Kamoshita
Yasushi Kaneko
Kazuyoshi Kaneko
Eiko Kaneta
Katsunobu Kato
Koichi Kato
Katsuyuki Kawai
Yoshihiro Kawakami
Takeo Kawamura
Tsutomu Kawara
Jiro Kawasaki
Takahide Kimura
Ben Kimura
Taro Kimura
Yoshio Kimura
Fumio Kishida
Tomokatsu Kitagawa
Seigo Kitamura
Naoto Kitamura
Minoru Kiuchi
Koki Kobayashi
Makoto Koga
Yuriko Koike
Junichiro Koizumi
Ryuji Koizumi
Toshio Kojima
Saburo Komoto
Masahiko Komura
Motohiko Kondo
Osamu Konishi
Taro Kono
Kenji Kosaka
Takashi Kosugi
Akihiko Kumashiro
Masatoshi Kurata
Fumio Kyuma
Nobutaka Machimura
Toshio Masuda
Yoshitake Masuhara
Isao Matsumiya
Jun Matsumoto
Hirokazu Matsuno
Toshikatsu Matsuoka
Midori Matsushima
Tadahiro Matsushita
Asahiko Mihara
Nobuhide Minorikawa
Takashi Mitsubayashi
Norio Mitsuya
Kazuaki Miyaji
Mitsuhiro Miyakoshi
Ichiro Miyashita
Yoichi Miyazawa
Kenichi Mizuno
Yoshio Mochizuki
Eisuke Mori
Yoshiro Mori
Masahiro Morioka
Hajime Morita
Hiroshi Moriyama
Mayumi Moriyama
Toshimitsu Motegi
Jin Murai
Seiichiro Murakami
Yoshitaka Murata
Kabun Muto
Yoji Nagaoka
Jinen Nagase
Shoichi Nakagawa
Hidenao Nakagawa
Seiji Nakamura
Shozaburo Nakamura
Kazuyoshi Nakanishi
Kiyoshi Nakano
Masashi Nakano
Gen Nakatani
Yasuhide Nakayama
Taro Nakayama
Nariaki Nakayama
Takumi Nemoto
Toshihiro Nikai
Takeshi Nishida
Koya Nishikawa
Kyoko Nishikawa
Kosaburo Nishime
Akihiro Nishimura
Akira Nishino
Yuya Niwa
Seiko Noda
Takeshi Noda
Hosei Norota
Kazuko Nose
Fukushiro Nukaga
Yuko Obuchi
Yoshiro Okamoto
Hachiro Okonogi
Shinsuke Okuno
Shigeo Omae
Koji Omi
Hideaki Omura
Shinya Ono
Yoshinori Ono
Matsushige Ono
Itsunori Onodera
Tadamori Oshima
Sadatoshi Ozato
Toshitsugu Saito
Tetsushi Sakamoto
Goji Sakamoto
Yoshitaka Sakurada
Ikuzo Sakurai
Takashi Sasagawa
Genichiro Sata
Akira Satō
Tsutomu Sato
Ren Sato
Shinji Sato
Tatsuo Sato
Masahiko Shibayama
Akira Shichijo
Yoshinobu Shimamura
Hakubun Shimomura
Ryu Shionoya
Yasuhisa Shiozaki
Hiroyuki Sonoda
Yoshihide Suga
Isshu Sugawara
Seiken Sugiura
Keisuke Sunada
Tsuneo Suzuki
Junji Suzuki
Shunichi Suzuki
Kotaro Tachibana
Tsuyoshi Takagi
Tsutomu Takebe
Ryota Takeda
Naokazu Takemoto
Wataru Takeshita
Makoto Taki
Tokuichiro Tamazawa
Norihisa Tamura
Yasufumi Tanahashi
Kazunori Tanaka
Hideo Tanaka
Koichi Tani
Sadakazu Tanigaki
Yaichi Tanigawa
Takashi Tanihata
Tatsuya Tanimoto
Ryotaro Tanose
Minoru Terada
Kisaburo Tokai
Shinako Tsuchiya
Yuji Tsushima
Kyoichi Tsushima
Shigeo Uetake
Osamu Uno
Hiromichi Watanabe
Tomoyoshi Watanabe
Yoshimi Watanabe
Tamisuke Watanuki
Daishiro Yamagiwa
Taimei Yamaguchi
Shunichi Yamaguchi
Yuji Yamamoto
Akihiko Yamamoto
Taku Yamamoto
Koichi Yamamoto
Takafumi Yamashita
Takuji Yanagimoto
Hakuo Yanagisawa
Eita Yashiro
Okiharu Yasuoka
Yoshio Yatsu
Kaoru Yosano
Masayoshi Yoshino

New Komeito (34 members)
Kazuyoshi Akaba
Masao Akamatsu
Yasuyuki Eda
Otohiko Endo
Yutaka Fukushima
Noriko Furuya
Tetsuzo Fuyushiba
Junji Higashi
Yasuko Ikenobo
Yoshihisa Inoue
Noritoshi Ishida
Keiichi Ishii
Takenori Kanzaki
Masatomo Kawai
Nobuo Kawakami
Kazuo Kitagawa
Kaori Maruya
Keigo Masuya
Hiroaki Nagasawa
Hiroyoshi Nishi
Yoshinori Oguchi
Akihiro Ota
Tetsuo Saito
Chikara Sakaguchi
Shigeki Sato
Taiichi Shiraho
Masahiro Tabata
Michiyo Takagi
Yosuke Takagi
Takayoshi Taniguchi
Shigeyuki Tomita
Isamu Ueda
Yoshio Urushibara
Yasuhide Yamana

The Opposition

Democratic Party (178 members)

Hirotaka Akamatsu
Yukihiko Akutsu
Ai Aoki
Satoshi Arai
Jun Azumi
Yutaka Banno
Ryuichi Doi
Yukio Edano
Hirohisa Fujii
Osamu Fujimura
Kazue Fujita
Yukihisa Fujita
Motohisa Furukawa
Shinichiro Furumoto
Koichiro Gemba
Masanori Goto
Yoshio Hachiro
Keiko Hakariya
Kazuhiro Haraguchi
Kiyohito Hashimoto
Tsutomu Hata
Yukio Hatoyama
Miyoko Hida
Takeshi Hidaka
Hirofumi Hirano
Hideo Hiraoka
Hiranao Honda
Ikuo Horigome
Ritsuo Hosokawa
Goshi Hosono
Yasuo Ichikawa
Koichiro Ichimura
Fumihiko Igarashi
Motohisa Ikeda
Tetsuo Inami
Kazuo Inoue
Katsuyuki Ishida
Eiko Ishige
Hajime Ishii
Chuji Ito
Tetsundo Iwakuni
Kenta Izumi
Fusaho Izumi
Hideo Jimpu
Masamitsu Jojima
Banri Kaieda
Yasuhiro Kajiwara
Sayuri Kamata
Naoto Kan
Seiichi Kaneta
Michihiko Kano
Naohiko Kato
Koichi Kato
Tatsuo Kawabata
Takashi Kawamura
Hiroshi Kawauchi
Takashi Kii
Toru Kikawada
Makiko Kikuta
Shuji Kira
Takeshi Kishimoto
Kenji Kitahashi
Kenji Kobayashi
Chiyomi Kobayashi
Tadamasa Kodaira
Issei Koga
Toshiaki Koizumi
Yasuko Komiyama
Yoko Komiyama
Yosuke Kondo
Shoichi Kondo
Azuma Konno
Daizo Kusuda
Sumio Mabuchi
Yukichi Maeda
Seiji Maehara
Yoshio Maki
Seishu Makino
Teruhiko Mashiko
Jin Matsubara
Kenko Matsuki
Takeaki Matsumoto
Daisuke Matsumoto
Ryu Matsumoto
Yorihisa Matsuno
Nobuo Matsuno
Kimiaki Matsuzaki
Tetsuhisa Matsuzaki
Taizo Mikazuki
Wakio Mitsui
Hiroko Mizushima
Muneaki Murai
Hirotami Murakoshi
Kunihiko Muroi
Hiroyuki Nagahama
Akihisa Nagashima
Hisayasu Nagata
Akira Nagatsuma
Takashi Nagayasu
Osamu Nakagawa
Masaharu Nakagawa
Hiroshi Nakai
Tetsuji Nakamura
Yasuhiro Nakane
Jo Nakano
Hiroko Nakano
Hirosato Nakatsugawa
Ikko Nakatsuka
Yoshikatsu Nakayama
Kinya Narazaki
Chinami Nishimura (politician)
Shingo Nishimura
Yoshihiko Noda
Akihiro Ohata
Akira Oide
Hisako Oishi
Katsuya Okada
Kazumasa Okajima
Mitsunori Okamoto
Ken Okuda
Tenzo Okumura
Atsushi Oshima
Nobumori Otani
Sakihito Ozawa
Ichiro Ozawa
Hirofumi Ryu
Muneaki Samejima
Hidenori Sasaki
Koji Sato
Kenichiro Sato
Yoshito Sengoku
Satoshi Shima
Hisashi Shimada
Mitsu Shimojo
Takashi Shinohara
Yasuhiro Sonoda
Hiroshi Sudo
Yoshinori Suematsu
Nobuhiko Suto
Yasutomo Suzuki
Katsumasa Suzuki
Issei Tajima
Kaname Tajima
Miho Takai
Yoshiaki Takaki
Satoshi Takayama
Koichi Takemasa
Yuriko Takeyama
Kazuya Tamaki
Keishu Tanaka
Makiko Tanaka
Yoshikazu Tarui
Shinji Tarutoko
Takuya Tasso
Manabu Terata
Yoshio Tezuka
Megumu Tsuji
Keisuke Tsumura
Nobutaka Tsutsui
Yuzuru Tsuzuki
Yukio Ubukata
Akira Uchiyama
Noboru Usami
Takashi Wada
Yasuhiko Wakai
Seizō Wakaizumi
Shu Watanabe
Kozo Watanabe
Masahiko Yamada
Ikuo Yamahana
Kazunori Yamanoi
Kenji Yamaoka
Osamu Yamauchi
Takahiro Yokomichi
Takashi Yonezawa
Izumi Yoshida
Osamu Yoshida

Japan Communist Party (8 members)
 Ikuko Ishii
 Keiji Kokuta
 Kensho Sasaki
 Kazuo Shii
 Tetsuya Shiokawa
 Chizuko Takahashi
 Tomio Yamaguchi
 Hidekatsu Yoshii

Social Democratic Party (6 members)
Tomoko Abe
Takako Doi
Kantoku Teruya
Mitsuko Tomon
Kiyohiro Yamamoto
Katsuhiko Yokomitsu

Independents (7 members)
 Junichiro Koga
 Yohei Kono
 Kansei Nakano
 Yasutoshi Nishimura
 Torao Tokuda
 Shogo Tsugawa

Politics of Japan
Japan politics-related lists
21st-century Japanese politicians